A Bugged Out Mix by Klaxons is a compilation album compiled by British dance-punk band Klaxons.

Track listing
Source: Amazon

References 

Klaxons albums
2007 compilation albums